Plantago triantha is an annual plant of the family Plantaginaceae that is found in both Tasmania and the Auckland Islands.

Conservation status
In both 2009 and 2012 it was deemed to be "At Risk — Naturally Uncommon" under the New Zealand Threat Classification System, and this classification was reaffirmed in 2018, due to the species having a restricted range in New Zealand while being secure overseas.

Taxonomy
It was first described by Robert Brown in 1810 as Plantago carnosa, an illegal name, since it had already been used by Jean-Baptiste Lamarck for a different plant in 1792.  It was first properly published as Plantago triantha in 1824 by Kurt Polycarp Joachim Sprengel.

References

External links
Plantago triantha images and occurrence data from GBIF
Plantago triantha occurrence data from AVH

triantha
Flora of New Zealand
Flora of Tasmania
Flora of the Auckland Islands
Plants described in 1824